Private Audition is the sixth studio album by American rock band Heart, released on June 5, 1982, by Epic Records. The album reached number 25 on the US Billboard 200, spending 14 weeks on the chart. It spawned the single "This Man Is Mine", which peaked at number 33 on the Billboard Hot 100. It is the last Heart album to feature longtime members Mike Derosier and Steve Fossen, who left after the recording of the album and were replaced by Denny Carmassi and Mark Andes.

In 2009, Private Audition was re-released by BGO Records as a double CD with the band's subsequent album, Passionworks (1983). Prior to this, Private Audition had been out of print for a number of years and was Heart's most difficult CD to obtain.

Track listing

Personnel
Credits adapted from the liner notes of Private Audition.

Heart
 Ann Wilson – vocals ; piano ; backing vocals ; flutes ; bass guitar 
 Nancy Wilson – second vocal ; acoustic guitar ; electric piano, acoustic piano ; bass guitar ; vocals ; acoustic six- and twelve-string guitars ; electric guitar ; piano ; piano strings ; backing vocals ; pedal steel guitar ; blues harp
 Howard Leese – electric guitar ; synthesizers ; Moog drum ; acoustic guitar ; orchestra bells ; acoustic twelve-string ; vocals ; piano strings ; Hammond organ ; Moog bass, computer effects, clavioline ; bass guitar, alto recorder ; cymbal , strings score and conducting 
 Steve Fossen – bass 
 Michael Derosier – drums

Additional musicians
 Lynn Wilson – vocals ; backing vocals 
 Sue Ennis – piano

Technical
 Connie – production
 Howie – production
 David Thoener – engineering, mixing at the Record Plant, mastering at Sterling Sound
 Shelly Yakus – engineering
 Brian Foraker – engineering assistance, mixing at the Record Plant
 Rob Perkins – engineering assistance
 Steve Marcantonio – mixing at the Record Plant (New York City)
 Greg Calbi – mastering at Sterling Sound (New York City)

Artwork
 Dale Windham – photography

Charts

Notes

References

1982 albums
Albums recorded at Wally Heider Studios
Epic Records albums
Heart (band) albums